U.S. Highway 12 (US 12) is an east–west United States Numbered Highway in the state of Montana.

US 12 in Montana has been defined as the Lewis and Clark Highway despite not being the route followed by Lewis and Clark across the state.

Route description

US 12 continues northeasterly through Missoula's downtown, eventually meeting Interstate 90 (I-90). This two-lane section of the trip passes through Avon and Elliston winding through Helena National Forest, over the Continental Divide at MacDonald Pass, and then through Montana's capital city, Helena.

On the east end of Helena, US 12 passes over I-15 at which point it joins US 287 south. On the east end of Harlowton, the routes meet with Montana Highway 3 (MT 3), where US 191 and MT 3 share a common alignment and continue north to Lewistown and MT 3 joins US 12. US 12 and MT 3 continue east for  before MT 3 heads south near Lavina and continues to Billings. US 12 continues east  until the junction of US 87 and the two routes continue as a  concurrency through Roundup.

History

Major intersections

See also

References

External links

 Montana

12
Transportation in Missoula County, Montana
Transportation in Granite County, Montana
Transportation in Powell County, Montana
Transportation in Lewis and Clark County, Montana
Transportation in Broadwater County, Montana
Transportation in Meagher County, Montana
Transportation in Wheatland County, Montana
Transportation in Golden Valley County, Montana
Transportation in Musselshell County, Montana
Transportation in Rosebud County, Montana
Transportation in Custer County, Montana
Transportation in Fallon County, Montana